Martinstown may refer to:

Island of Ireland
Martinstown, County Antrim, Northern Ireland
Martinstown, Delvin, a townland in the civil parish of Delvin, barony of Delvin, County Westmeath, Republic of Ireland
Martinstown, Lickbla, a townland in the civil parish of Lickbla, barony of Fore, County Westmeath, Republic of Ireland
Martinstown, St. Mary's, a townland in the civil parish of St. Mary's, barony of Fore, County Westmeath, Republic of Ireland
Martinstown, Stonehall, a townland in Stonehall civil parish, barony of Corkaree, County Westmeath, Republic of Ireland

Elsewhere
Martinstown, Missouri, a community in the United States
Winterborne St Martin, Dorset, England, commonly known as Martinstown